In reflection seismology, a flat spot is a seismic attribute anomaly that appears as a horizontal reflector cutting across the stratigraphy elsewhere present on the seismic image.  Its appearance can indicate the presence of hydrocarbons.  Therefore, it is known as a direct hydrocarbon indicator and is used by geophysicists in hydrocarbon exploration.

Theory
A flat spot can result from the increase in acoustic impedance when a gas-filled porous rock (with a lower acoustic impedance) overlies a liquid-filled porous rock (with a higher acoustic impedance).  It may stand out on a seismic image because it is flat and will contrast with surrounding dipping reflections.

Caution
There are a number of other possible reasons for there being a flat spot on a seismic image.  It could be representative of a mineralogical change in the subsurface or an unresolved shallower multiple.  Additionally, the interpretation of a flat spot should be attempted after depth conversion to confirm that the anomaly is actually flat.

See also
Bright spot
Seismic attribute
Reflection seismology

References

Seismology measurement
Petroleum geology